St. Mary's Monastery Church may be:

St. Mary's Monastery Church, Dhivër, Albania
St. Mary's Monastery Church, Tranoshisht, Albania
St. Mary's Monastery Church, Lubonjë, Albania
St. Mary's Monastery Church, Piqeras, Albania
St. Mary's Monastery Church, Koshovicë, Albania 
St. Mary of the Angels Church and Monastery, Green Bay, Wisconsin

See also
St. Mary's Church (disambiguation)
St. Mary's Monastery (disambiguation)